Pico, California may refer to:
 A settlement near Whittier, California that is now the northern portion of Pico Rivera, California
 Pico-Union, Los Angeles, California
 Pico Canyon, California; now part of Stevenson Ranch, California